The Thomas B. Townsend House, on the corner of Townsend Street and S. 5th St. in Montrose, Colorado, was built in 1888.  It was listed on the National Register of Historic Places (NRHP) in 1980.

According to its NRHP nomination, it is "one of the oldest permanent residences in the valley" and had "'running water'" from a system of rain troughs and a cistern in its attic.  The house "is an excellent example of the American Victorian style of architecture."  The house is built of brick from a brick plant that may have been used only to make bricks for this house.

References

Houses on the National Register of Historic Places in Colorado
Victorian architecture in Colorado
Houses completed in 1888
Houses in Montrose County, Colorado
National Register of Historic Places in Montrose County, Colorado